Renard is a French-language surname.  Notable people with the name include:

 Henriette Rénard (d. 1721 or 1722), a mistress of Augustus the Strong, King of Poland and Elector of Saxony
 Marie-Jeanne Renard du Bos (1701 – 1730-1750), French engraver

 Alexandre Renard (1906–1983), French Roman Catholic Cardinal and Archbishop of Lyon
 Alexandre Renard (tennis), French tennis player, see 2010 Open Prévadiès Saint–Brieuc – Doubles
 Alfred Renard (1895–1988), Belgian aeronautical engineer
 Alphonse François Renard (1842–1903), Belgian geologist
 André Renard (1911–1962), Belgian leader of an important tendency in Walloon trade unionism
 André Renard (cyclist), see List of cyclists in the 1919 Tour de France
 Andre Renard (sailor), see Soling World Championships
 Augusta Öhrström-Renard (1856–1921), Swedish mezzo-soprano opera singer
 Bertrand Renard (born 1955), French television presenter and author
 Charles Renard (1847–1905), French military engineer who proposed preferred numbers
 Christine Renard (1929–1979), French writer of science fiction and fantasy
 Colette Renard (1924–2010), French singer and actress
 Claire Renard (born 1944), French composer and multimedia artist
 Damien Renard (born 1980), French orienteering competitor
 Emile Renard (1850–1930), French artist and teacher at Académie Colarossi
 Gabrielle Renard (1878–1959), nanny to the family of the painter Pierre-Auguste Renoir and a frequent model for him, and also recognized as the mentor to filmmaker Jean Renoir
 Gary Renard (born 1951), the author of The Disappearance of the Universe
 Gaston Renard (1868–1937), Belgian Olympic fencer
Gregory Renard (born 1995), better known as DJ Yung Vamp, Belgian DJ and record producer
 Guy Rénard (born 1934), Belgian former sports shooter
 Hervé Renard (born 1968), French football player and manager
 Ian Renard, 19th Chancellor of the University of Melbourne, from February 2005 to January 2009
 Jean-Claude Renard (1922–2002), French poet
 Jeffery Renard Allen (born 1962), American poet, essayist, short story writer, and novelist
 Jules Renard (1864–1910), French author
 Lucien Renard, Belgian cyclist
 Marie Renard (1864–1939), Austrian operatic mezzo-soprano, later soprano
 Maurice Renard (1875–1939), French author
 Mercedes Renard, American actress
 Michel Renard (1924–1988), politician from Martinique who served in the French National Assembly from 1986–1988
 Olivier Renard (born 1979), Belgian football goalkeeper
 Raymond Renard (1925–2020), Belgian writer and linguist
 Roberto Silva Renard (1855–1920), Chilean military and political figure
 Rosita Renard (1894–1949), Chilean classical pianist
 Sandrine Renard, newscaster on Naked News
 Simon Renard (1513–1573), Spanish ambassador in France and England
 Veronique Renard (born 1965), Dutch author and Tibet activist also known as Pantau
 Wendie Renard (born 1990), French football player
 Emil Kio (1894–1965), Russian magician, born Emil Hirschfeld-Renard

French-language surnames
Surnames from nicknames